Amenemhatankh (his name means “Amenemhat lives”) was an ancient Egyptian prince of the 12th Dynasty, son of Amenemhat II.

Attestations
Amenhemhatankh is mentioned on a false door which was originally in his tomb but was found reused in the tomb of Khenemet and Siese at Dahshur. He is also mentioned on the base of a broken statue of him, found in Saqqara and now in the Egyptian Museum, on which his appointing of a priest named Tetiemsaf is recorded. His name also appears on a statue of Horemsaf from Saqqara; on a statue base found in the Precinct of Mut in the Karnak temple, now located in Cairo and in the tomb inscriptions of the vizier Khnumhotep, Tomb 2 at Dahshur.

Sources

Princes of the Twelfth Dynasty of Egypt